Great Penck Glacier was on Mount Kilimanjaro in Tanzania, on the west slope of the peak. Between the years 1962 and 1975, Great Penck Glacier separated from the Northern Icefield and disappeared. Drygalski Glacier once also existed to the north of Great Penck, while the same is true of the Little Penck Glacier, which was to the south.

See also
Retreat of glaciers since 1850
List of glaciers in Africa

References

Glaciers of Tanzania